Darnell L. Moore (born January 24, 1976) is an American writer and activist whose work is informed by anti-racist, feminist, queer of color, and anti-colonial thought and advocacy. Darnell's essays, social commentary, poetry, and interviews have appeared in various national and international media venues, including the Feminist Wire, Ebony magazine, The Huffington Post, The New York Times, and The Advocate.

Early life and education
Moore was born in Camden, New Jersey.

Moore received his Bachelor of Arts degree in Social and Behavioral Science from Seton Hall University, a Master of Arts degree in Clinical Counseling from Eastern University, and a Master of Arts degree in Theological Studies from the Princeton Theological Seminary.

Career 
Moore was appointed by Mayor Cory Booker as inaugural Chair of the city of Newark, New Jersey LGBT Concerns Advisory Commission, the first of its kind in the state of New Jersey. He is the co-chair, with Beryl Satter, of the groundbreaking Queer Newark Oral History project—an archival project that seeks to chronicle the multifaceted lives of LGBTQ Newarkers and their allies.

Moore's scholarship focuses broadly on Black theology and Black Christian thought that is inclusive of queer subjectivities. He has published peer-reviewed essays that attempt to queer Black Christian thought in Black Theology: An International Journal, Theology & Sexuality, and Pneuma: The Journal of the Society for Pentecostal Studies. He was a member of the Beyond Apologetics colloquium organized by theologians Joretta Marshall and Duane Bidwell, which brought together scholars/pastors centered on the themes of sexual identity, pastoral theology, and pastoral practice. Moore was also a selected participant in the 2012 Seminar on Debates on Religion and Sexuality convened by theologian Mark Jordan at Harvard Divinity School.

He is an Editorial Collective Member of the Feminist Wire and co-author, with former NFL player Wade Davis, II, of a bi-monthly column on The Huffington Post Gay Voices focused on black manhood and queer politics titled "Tongues Untied." Moore has served appointments as a visiting fellow at Yale Divinity School and a visiting scholar at the Center for the Study of Gender and Sexuality at New York University and has served as a Lecturer at Rutgers University and The City College of New York (CUNY). Moore is a board member of the Center for Lesbian and Gay Studies at CUNY and The Tobago Center for Study and Practice of Indigenous Spirituality. He has interviewed Frank Mugisha, Steve Harper, Cheryl Clarke (Lambda Literary), Amiri Baraka and Mayor Cory Booker. Moore is part of the Audre Lorde Human Rights Speaker Series at The Sexuality, Gender & Human Rights Program at Harvard Kennedy School, CARR Center for Human RIghts Policy

Moore's memoir, No Ashes in the Fire, a “critically-acclaimed memoir about growing up black and queer in New Jersey in the ’80s”, was released in 2018. The book was selected as A New York Times Notable Book of the Year and won the Lambda Literary Award for Gay Memoir/Biography.

Moore is now a Director of Inclusion for Content and Marketing at Netflix. He hosts the podcast, Being Seen, which focusses on the gay and queer Black male experience.

Editing 
In 2013 he edited the book Astor Place – Broadway – New York about a barber shop, one of the last stores remaining from the 1940s in Lower Manhattan, with photographs by Nicolaus Schmidt.

He is working on a co-edited anthology which examines the intersections and convergences within America's contemporaneous moments of radical protest, an essay collection, and book on Black queer Christian thought.

Citations
Moore's Center for the Study of Gender and Sexuality talk cited in Carolyn Poljski, Coming Out, Coming Home or Inviting People In? Supporting same-sex attracted women from immigrant and refugee communities, 2011.
Moore's work on "complex relationships between race and sexuality in the black community" cited in Patrick S. Cheng's Radical Love: An Introduction to Queer Theology, 2011.

Theoretical contributions
"Intralocality" is a theoretical perspective conceptualized by Moore. Moore employs intralocality as an analytic that extends Kimberlé Crenshaw's theory of intersectionality. According to Moore, "Borrowing from sociologists, the term 'social location,' which broadly speaks to one's context, highlights one's standpoint(s)—the social spaces where s/he is positioned (i.e., race, class, gender, geographical, etc.) Intralocality, then, is concerned with the social locations that foreground our knowing and experiencing of our world and our relationships to the systems and people within our world. Intralocality is a call to theorize the self in relation to power and privilege, powerlessness and subjugation. It is work that requires the locating of the 'I' in the intersection. And while it could be argued that such work is highly individualistic, I contend that it is at the very level of self-in-relation-to-community where communal transformation is made possible."

Palestinian solidarity work
 In January 2012, Moore visited Israel and the Palestinian territories as a member of the first US LGBTQ Delegation to Palestine organized by scholar/activist Sarah Schulman.
 Moore is a member of the International Committee on Queer BDS and Pinkwashing for World Social Forum 2013.

Personal life
Moore lives in Los Angeles. He identifies as queer.

Honors and awards
 2012: American Conference on Diversity, Humanitarian Award – for his advocacy in the city of Newark where he served as Chair of the LGBTQ Concerns Advisory Commission under the auspices of Mayor Cory A. Booker
 2012: Rutgers University LGBTQ and Diversity Resource Center, Outstanding Academic Leadership Award – with Prof. Beryl Satter, for their work on developing the Queer Newark Oral History Project
 First Annual Episcopal Diocese of Newark's Dr. Louie Crew Scholarship for individuals and groups working "at the intersection of sexuality and faith."
 In June 2019, to mark the 50th anniversary of the Stonewall Riots, sparking the start of the modern LGBTQ rights movement, Queerty named him one of the Pride50 “trailblazing individuals who actively ensure society remains moving towards equality, acceptance and dignity for all queer people.

Works and publications

Books

Articles 
 
 
 
 
 
 
 Moore, Darnell L. (June 25, 2019) "The Gentrification of Queerness". The Nation.

See also
 LGBT culture in New York City
 List of LGBT people from New York City

References

Further reading 
 Uptown Social Magazine: Darnell L. Moore.  (feature).
 Signified: Darnell Moore. (documentary).

External links
 
 
 
 Where is your line? Inspiring Young Leaders to End Sexual Violence, Darnell Moore & Queer Newark Oral History Project.

1976 births
Living people
African-American Christians
African-American feminists
American male writers
American anti-racism activists
Proponents of Christian feminism
Critical race theory
Critical theorists
Lambda Literary Award winners
LGBT African Americans
LGBT Christians
LGBT feminists
LGBT people from New Jersey
American LGBT writers
Male feminists
Postcolonialism
Writers from New Jersey
Queer memoirists
Queer men